Qaramahmudlu (also, Garamakhmudlu, Garamakhmudly, and Garamakhmutly) is a village and municipality in the Kurdamir Rayon of Azerbaijan.

References 

Populated places in Kurdamir District